The Charter of Quaregnon is a political manifesto agreed to in 1894 that formed the doctrinal basis for successive socialist parties in Belgium until 1979.

In 1894, Belgian elections were, for the first time, held according to the scheme of the plural right to vote under the pressure of the violent Belgian general strike of 1893. That meant that for the Belgian Labour Party (POB-BWP), workers for the first time could vote, and representatives from the party, ten years after its foundation, could enter the Belgian parliament. With a doctrinarian charter, the program of the socialist party was presented to the electorate. Out of several ideas, Émile Vandervelde chose this proposition, which was adopted at the Easter Congress of the Socialist Party, at Quaregnon, near Mons, in Hainaut Province, on 25 and 26 March 1894. It became known as the Charter of Quaregnon. The charter was strongly influenced by ideas of the French socialist Jules Guesde.

As a doctrinal source of inspiration for the Belgian Socialists, the Charter of Quaregnon remained in place for two world wars and many years. Only after 1979, when the Belgian Socialist Party (PSB-BSP) divided into the Dutch-speaking Socialistische Partij (SP) and the French-speaking Parti Socialiste (PS), newer charters were created.

Text

See also
 Plan De Man (1933)
 The Communist Manifesto
 Oxford Manifesto

References
 Inleiding tot de geschiedenis van de Belgische arbeidersbeweging
 Th. Luykx and M. Platel, Politieke geschiedenis van België, 2 vol., Kluwer, 1985
 E. Witte, J. Craeybeckx en A. Meynen, Politieke geschiedenis van België, Standaard, 1997

External links
 Inleiding tot de geschiedenis van de Belgische arbeidersbeweging (Dutch)

Socialism in Belgium
Political parties in Belgium
Politics of Belgium
Political manifestos
Party platforms
1894 in Belgium
1894 documents